Joseph Benson Hardaway (May 21, 1895 – February 5, 1957) was an American storyboard artist, animator, voice actor, gagman, writer and director for several American animation studios during The Golden Age of Hollywood animation. He was sometimes credited as J. B. Hardaway, Ben Hardaway, B. Hardaway and Bugs Hardaway. He fought in World War I in the 129th Field Artillery Regiment, Battery D.

Army service 
Hardaway was enlisted in World War I on June 4, 1917, and was discharged on April 9, 1919, a total of 26 months. He was led in the 129th Field Artillery Regiment by future president Harry S. Truman, in which he attended his reception planned by Forrest Smith at the Shoreham Hotel in 1949 and his inauguration, following him being re-elected. The last 14 months of his service were served in France.

Career 
Hardaway started his career at the Kansas City Post as a cartoonist before eventually going into the animation business, working for the Kansas City Film Ad Service. He later worked for the Walt Disney Animation Studios and the Ub Iwerks Studio, after which Hardaway was hired by the Leon Schlesinger studio as a gagman for the Friz Freleng unit. He was promoted to director for seven Buddy animated shorts. Afterwards he resumed working as a gagman and storyman. He started receiving film credits in 1937. His writing credits include Daffy Duck & Egghead and The Penguin Parade.

While at the Schlesinger/Warner Bros. studio during the late 1930s, Hardaway served as a storyman, and co-directed several Looney Tunes and Merrie Melodies shorts with Cal Dalton during Friz Freleng's two-year exodus to Metro-Goldwyn-Mayer. Leon Schlesinger needed a replacement for Freleng, and Hardaway's previous experience in the job resulted in his promotion. In 1938, Hardaway co-directed Porky's Hare Hunt, the first film to feature a rabbit. When this unnamed, embryonic rabbit was given a new model sheet for a later short, since, according to Chuck Jones, Hardaway "didn't draw it very well", designer Charlie Thorson inadvertently offered a permanent name by titling the model sheet "Bugs' Bunny" since it was meant for Hardaway's unit. By the time the rabbit was redesigned and refined for the film A Wild Hare, the name was already being used in relation to the character in studio publicity materials. The name Bugs' Bunny shows up in comics and merchandise as late as 1943.

When Freleng left MGM to return to Warner Bros. in 1939, Hardaway was demoted back to storyman. In 1940, Hardaway joined the staff of Walter Lantz Productions, where he helped Walter Lantz in creating the studio's most famous character, Woody Woodpecker. Hardaway wrote or co-wrote most of the stories for the 1940–1950 Woody Woodpecker shorts, as well as supplying Woody's voice between 1944 and 1949. Shamus Culhane, the director of the Woody cartoons in the 40's, thought Hardaway's humor was crude and formulaic. Nevertheless, the collaboration worked, and many consider this the golden era of Woody cartoons. During his second year at Lantz, he wrote the story for Scrub Me Mama with a Boogie Beat, whose reissue got withdrawn by Universal in February 1949 due to multiple complaints from the NAACP for its racist stereotypes of African-Americans.

Hardaway died in 1957 from cancer, supposedly a long-term effect of exposure to chemical weapons during World War I. Most obituaries in newspapers said he was 66, despite the fact that he was born in 1895, not 1890, and they noted his creations Bugs Bunny and Woody Woodpecker.  The last project he worked on was Adventures of Pow Wow, although he only wrote four episodes, which have lost audio.

References

External links 

1895 births
1957 deaths
American male voice actors
American male screenwriters
American animated film directors
Animators from Missouri
American television writers
Film directors from Missouri
American male television writers
American storyboard artists
Burials at Forest Lawn Memorial Park (Hollywood Hills)
Warner Bros. Cartoons directors
Walt Disney Animation Studios people
20th-century American male writers
20th-century American screenwriters
Walter Lantz Productions people
American military personnel of World War I